Austin Michael Beutner (born April 8, 1960) is an American businessman who served as Los Angeles Unified School District Superintendent from May 1, 2018 to June 30, 2021. He previously served as the first deputy mayor of Los Angeles from 2010 through 2013, and briefly ran in the 2013 Los Angeles mayoral election. Prior to entering politics, Beutner was an investment banker and would later become the publisher and CEO of the Los Angeles Times and The San Diego Union-Tribune.

Life

Early life and education 
Beutner was born in New York and raised in Grand Rapids, Michigan, the son of German immigrants who came to the United States in the 1920s for economic opportunity. His mother was a schoolteacher and his father was a manufacturing engineer. His mother was Jewish and his father was Roman Catholic, although he did not find out that his father's family was Christian until he was an adult. He is a graduate of East Grand Rapids High School, and graduated from Dartmouth College with a Bachelor of Arts in economics.

Beutner has lectured at the University of Southern California Bedrosian Center on Governance, the UCLA Anderson School of Management, and the Columbia University Graduate School of Journalism. Beutner is a senior lecturer at Harvard Business School. In 2016, Beutner gave the commencement address to the 2016 graduating class of the USC Price School of Public Policy.

Personal life 
Beutner is married to Virginia Woltz Beutner. They have 4 children.

Philanthropy 
In 1994 Austin Beutner founded The Beutner Family Foundation with a focus on philanthropy and education for economically disadvantaged people.

In 2012 Beutner founded Vision To Learn, a; non-profit that provides children with free eye exams and free glasses by bringing its mobile eye clinics to schools and to other neighborhood youth and community organizations. Since 2012 Vision To Learn has helped more than 100,000 school kids with free eye exams and glasses.

In March 2016, Beutner signed an amicus brief in support of The Deferred Action for Childhood Arrivals (DACA) expansion and the Deferred Action for Parents of Americans (DAPA) which would provide relief for millions of immigrant families and their communities.

Career

Finance 
After graduating in 1982 he went to work at Smith Barney as a financial analyst. At the age of 29, he became partner at The Blackstone Group.

In 1996 Beutner co-founded Evercore Partners, an American independent investment banking advisory firm, with former Deputy Secretary of the Treasury Roger Altman. When Evercore went public (NYES-EVR) in 2006, the IPO reportedly made Beutner more than $100 million.

Government 
After the fall of the Soviet Union, Beutner went to work for the U.S. State Department. The Clinton administration tapped him to lead a team into Russia and help transition them from communism to a free-market economy, including the decommission of weapons and other material.

In January 2010, Beutner was appointed by Antonio Villaraigosa to be the first deputy mayor of Los Angeles, with oversight of twelve city agencies, including the Port of Los Angeles, Department of Water and Power and the Housing Authority, with over 17,000 employees. As deputy mayor he focused on making the city more business-friendly and streamlining permitting processes. In 2013, with Villaraigosa's term ending, Beutner launched a campaign to run for Mayor of Los Angeles, but dropped from the race after a year having captured only 2% of likely voters. The election was a year away when Beutner suspended his efforts.

In 2013, Beutner and former U.S. Secretary of Commerce Mickey Kantor co-chaired the 2020 Commission to study and report on the financial matters in Los Angeles. One of the report's recommendations was to reform the Los Angeles Department of Water and Power (DWP). In 2016 Beutner and Kantor penned an op-ed in the Los Angeles Times aimed at bringing about reform and changes to the DWP, noting that "The city deserves a public utility that is operated in the long-term best interests of its customers, employees and our environment." In July 2017, Buetner created a task force for the Los Angeles Unified School District to look for solutions for declining attendance and other problems. Beutner co-chairs the task force with SEIU President Lophanza Butler. "We are here to support Michelle King, and offer suggestions," Beutner said in an interview with LA School Report.

On May 1, 2018, the Board appointed Austin Beutner and was met with criticism by United Teachers Los Angeles, who said that Beutner did not have any experience managing a school or a school district. In 2019, UTLA authorized a strike against LAUSD that lasted six days. About 30,000 teachers strike and only a third of about 500,000 students showed up to school, with the District losing $15 million on the first day. The strike ended after a deal between LAUSD and UTLA was reached. In 2020, the COVID-19 pandemic had forced the schools to shut down. He pushed for the schools to become vaccination sites and for the district to do testing on students and faculty. In 2021, Beutner announced that he would step down on June 30.

Newspaper ownership 
In March 2013, a group led by Beutner and Eli Broad announced their intent to purchase the Los Angeles Times from its parent Tribune Publishing. They were unsuccessful.

In 2014, Beutner took over as publisher and CEO of the Los Angeles Times when Eddy Hartenstein left to become the non-executive chairman of the board of Tribune Publishing. When Tribune Publishing acquired the San Diego Union-Tribune in 2015, Beutner was named its CEO and publisher, as well as CEO of the newly formed California News Group.

He was fired as publisher and chief executive officer of the Los Angeles Times on September 8, 2015. He wrote on Facebook that the dismissal was not voluntary: "I am not departing by choice, nor is this some 'mutual agreement' on my part and Tribune Publishing". Beutner's firing was protested by a number of prominent community leaders. Media analyst Ken Doctor called Beutner's departure "a small tragedy for American journalism."

During Beutner's 13 months as publisher, the Times won two Pulitzer Prizes — for cultural criticism and for feature writing — along with other national journalism awards for coverage of the California drought, the plight of Mexican farm workers and other stories. The California Newspaper Publishers Association awarded the Times its 2015 general excellence award.

In 2016, Beutner was invited to speak about the role of the media in homeland security and his experiences in the media and public service at the U.S. Naval Postgraduate School Center for Homeland Defense and Security. His keynote address was published in Watermark, the quarterly magazine of the U.S. Naval Postgraduate School – Center for Homeland Defense and Security.

In September 2017, Beutner was the keynote speaker of the Los Angeles Fire Department Chief Officers Association and  United Firefighters of Los Angeles City first Leadership Symposium.

In 2018, the Los Angeles Downtown News journal recognized Beutner "as a visionary with extensive political and business connections."

References

Living people
American people of German-Jewish descent
American financial businesspeople
American newspaper executives
Dartmouth College alumni
Los Angeles Times people
Los Angeles Times publishers (people)
Los Angeles Unified School District superintendents
1960 births